Chinatown Charlie is a 1928 silent film comedy directed by Charles Hines for release by First National Pictures. It stars actor Johnny Hines.

Status
One source states that a fragment and/or video copy survives of this picture at UCLA Film and Television Archive. Another source claims that it is lost.

Cast
Johnny Hines -  Charlie
Louise Lorraine - Annie Gordon
Harry Gribbon - Red Mike
Fred Kohler - Monk
Sojin Kamiyama - The Mandarin
Scooter Lowry - Oswald
Anna May Wong - Mandarin's Sweetheart
George Kuwa  -  Hip Sing Toy
John Burdette   - Gyp

References

External links
 
 

1928 films
American silent feature films
First National Pictures films
American black-and-white films
1928 comedy films
Silent American comedy films
Films with screenplays by John Grey
1920s American films